The Lucky Dime Caper Starring Donald Duck, released in Japan as  is a platform game released by Sega for the Game Gear and Master System in 1991. It features Donald Duck as the main character. Another game featuring Donald Duck for the Game Gear and Master System, Deep Duck Trouble, was released in 1993.

Gameplay
The game is a side-scrolling platformer. The gameplay follows the same pattern of Castle of Illusion Starring Mickey Mouse, which was released for Sega consoles a year before, but unlike Mickey, Donald can attack enemies by hitting them with a hammer or throwing discs. He can also attack faster by collecting star items.

The game consists of seven stages: the Northern Woods, the Great American Forest, the Andes Mountains, the Tropical Isles, the Pyramids and the South Pole, followed finally by Magica's Castle.

Despite the Master System and Game Gear being very similar systems, there are some differences between the two versions of the game:
 While following the same storyline, the intro sequences are different.
 The level select screen on the Game Gear does not have any music.
 The layout of platforms and enemy positions are different.
 In the Game Gear version, bonus items are pre-placed in the level, whereas in the Master System version they are only obtainable by defeating enemies.
 The Master System version allows players to backtrack, while the Game Gear version does not.
 Collecting five stars in the Master System game gives players limited invulnerability, while the Game Gear version gives additional points.
 When hit by an enemy, Donald loses his hammer weapon in the Master System version; it can be obtained as  bonus item after defeating an enemy. The hammer is not lost when hit by an enemy in the Game Gear version.

Plot

The evil witch Magica De Spell has stolen Scrooge McDuck's Number One Dime and kidnapped his nephews, Huey, Dewey, and Louie. Donald Duck embarks on a mission, traveling around the world to save his three nephews and recover Scrooge's lucky dime.

Release
The UK version of The Lucky Dime Caper was sold in a limited edition box set that included a Donald Duck-themed T-shirt and cassette tape with a selection of eight Disney music songs.

Reception

In a 1992 review, Game Zone described the game as "A bit on the slow side maybe but nice graphics, just about the right level of challenge and a fair variety of gameplay make up for that". In 1993, Sega Master Force stated "Although The Lucky Dime Caper's tough for a Disney game, it's a lot of fun and many players welcome a challenge. Great graphics, sound and game design have made it a classic."

Notes

References

External links

1991 video games
Donald Duck video games
Game Gear games
Master System games
Overworks games
Side-scrolling platform games
Single-player video games
Child abduction in fiction
Video games about children
Child abuse in fiction
Violence in video games
Video games about witchcraft
Video games developed in Japan
Video games set in Africa
Video games set in Antarctica
Video games set in castles
Video games set in Europe
Video games set in forests
Video games set in North America
Video games set in South America
Video games set on fictional islands